Leaderboard may refer to:

 Leader Board, a golf video game series
 Game ladder or ladder tournament, a form of tournament for games and sports
 High score, in a video game
 Leaderboard, a standard web banner size
 League table, a chart or table listing leaders in a competition